Cyclooctane is a cycloalkane with the molecular formula (CH2)8. It is a simple colourless hydrocarbon, but it is often a reference compound for saturated eight-membered ring compounds in general.

Cyclooctane has a camphoraceous odor.

Conformations

The conformation of cyclooctane has been studied extensively using computational methods. Hendrickson noted that "cyclooctane is unquestionably the conformationally most complex cycloalkane owing to the existence of many conformers of comparable energy". The boat-chair conformation (below) is the most stable form. This conformation was confirmed by Allinger and co-workers. The crown conformation (below) is slightly less stable. Among the many compounds exhibiting the crown conformation (structure II) is S8, elemental sulfur.

 {|class="wikitable" style="text-align: center;"
|+
|
|
|
|
|-
| colspan="2" |Boat-chair
| colspan="2" |Crown
|-
|
|
|
|
|-
|Tub
|Boat-boat
|Twist boat-chair
|Twist chair-chair
|}

Synthesis and reactions
The main route to cyclooctane derivatives involves the dimerization of butadiene, catalysed by nickel(0) complexes such as nickel bis(cyclooctadiene). This process affords, among other products, 1,5-cyclooctadiene (COD), which can be hydrogenated. COD is widely used for the preparation of precatalysts for homogeneous catalysis. The activation of these catalysts under H2, produces cyclooctane, which is usually discarded or burnt:
C8H12  +  2 H2   →   C8H16

Cyclooctane participates in no reactions except those typical of other saturated hydrocarbons, combustion and free radical halogenation. Work in 2009 on alkane functionalisation, using peroxides such as dicumyl peroxide, has opened up the chemistry to some extent, allowing for example the introduction of a phenylamino group.

References

Cycloalkanes
Hydrocarbon solvents
Eight-membered rings